Lívia Mossóczy (May 9, 1936 – August 18, 2017) was a female international table tennis player from Hungary.

Table tennis career
From 1957 to 1960 she won several medals in single, double, and team events in the Table Tennis European Championships, three medals with the Hungarian team in the World Table Tennis Championships.

The World Championship medal was a gold medal won in the doubles at the 1957 World Table Tennis Championships with Agnes Simon.

See also
 List of table tennis players
 List of World Table Tennis Championships medalists

References

 Results of Hungarian table tennis players at Sport.hu

1936 births
2017 deaths
Hungarian female table tennis players
Sportspeople from Budapest